Kalki was an Indian Tamil-language soap opera that aired on Jaya TV. The show is produced by Avni Telemedia and also the story writer, creative head and producer by Khusbhu Sundar. This was directed K. Natraj. Tamil Film actress Kushboo Sundar acted with Abhishek, Shyam Ganesh, Pooja, Ganthimathi, Delhi Ganesh, Aravind Akash and Vivek Anand

Plot
Kalki is the story about a woman named Kalki (Khusbhu Sundar) who falls in love with multi millionaire Abhishek. With the permission of Abhishek's family, they get married. Kalki also takes part in Abhishek's businesses. Later Abhishek learns that he has cancer and he will die soon, so he acts as if he hates Kalki (So that when he dies, she would break down). Later after Abhishek dies, in a very unavoidable situation, Kalki marries Abhishek's younger brother. The rest of the story is about how she manages the family business and how it got along with her husband.

Cast

 Kushboo Sundar as Kalki
 Abhishek
 Shyam Ganesh
Nithya Ravindran
 Vivek Anand as Dharani
 Mano
 Pooja Lokesh  
 Vennira Aadai Nirmala
 Y. Vijaya
 Geetha bapu
 A.R.S
 Vanthana
 Aravind Akash
 Rajkanth
 Delhi Ganesh
 Ganthimathi
 M.S. Viswanathan

Awards
 Best Actress – Khushbu for Kalki

See also
List of programs broadcast by Jaya TV

References

External links
Official website 
Jaya TV on Youtube

Jaya TV television series
2004 Tamil-language television series debuts
2006 Tamil-language television series endings
Tamil-language television shows